Pierre Court (born 31 March 1933) is a French field hockey player. He competed in the men's tournament at the 1960 Summer Olympics.

References

External links
 

1933 births
Living people
French male field hockey players
Olympic field hockey players of France
Field hockey players at the 1960 Summer Olympics
People from Montrouge